"Out of Dust" is an American television play broadcast on May 21, 1959 as part of the CBS television series, Playhouse 90.  The cast includes Charles Bickford and Gloria Talbott. The teleplay was written by John Gay based on a stage play written by Lynn Riggs.

Plot
A story of murder on the cattle trail in the old West. Three sons, a daughter-in-law and a hired man all hate the dictatorial Old Man Grant and conspire against him. It was taped outdoors in the Conejo Valley near Los Angeles.

Cast
The cast included the following:

 Charles Bickford - Old Man Grant
 Gloria Talbott - Rose
 Fritz Weaver - King
 Uta Hagen
 Dick York
 Wayne Morris

Production
The program aired on May 21, 1959, on the CBS television series Playhouse 90.

References

1959 American television episodes
Playhouse 90 (season 3) episodes
1959 television plays